Honky Tonk Boots is an album released in 2006 by American country music artist Sammy Kershaw. His only release for the Category 5 Records album, it was also his first studio release since 2003's I Want My Money Back. The album's lead-off single, "Tennessee Girl", peaked at number 43 on the Billboard country charts in 2006. Honky Tonk Boots also reunited him with producers Buddy Cannon and Norro Wilson, who co-produced his first four albums.

Three cover songs are included on this album. "Baby's Got Her Blue Jeans On", the second and final single, is a cover of Mel McDaniel's number one hit from his 1984 album Let It Roll. Kershaw's rendition failed to chart. "Evangeline" was previously a number 51-peaking single for Chad Brock in 1998 from his self-titled debut, which Cannon and Wilson also produced. "The Battle" was previously recorded by George Jones for his 1976 album of the same title. The single peaked at number 14.

Jeffrey B. Remz of Country Standard Time gave the album a positive review, comparing Kershaw's vocals favorably to George Jones and saying that "The Louisiana native has done his part in coming through with a meaty performance."

Track listing
"Tennessee Girl" (Bob DiPiero, Craig Wiseman) – 3:36
"Honky Tonk Boots" (Scott Blackwell, Billy Don Burns) – 2:47
"One Step at a Time" (Tim Mensy) – 3:41
"Evangeline" (Bob McDill, Carson Chamberlain) – 3:35
"Leavin' Made Easy" (Duane Steele, Jon Robbin) – 3:27
"Baby's Got Her Blue Jeans On" (McDill) – 3:10
"High Society" (McDill, Dickey Lee) – 3:13
"The Battle" (Norro Wilson, George Richey, Linda Kimball) – 2:50
"Mama's Got a Tattoo" (Ronnie Samoset, Alan Dysert) – 3:04
"Cantaloupes on Mars" (Danny Mayo) – 3:04

Personnel
Harold Bradley - baritone guitar
David Briggs - keyboards
Buddy Cannon - background vocals
Melonie Cannon - background vocals
Mark Casstevens - acoustic guitar
Mike Chapman - bass guitar
J. T. Corenflos - electric guitar
Stuart Duncan - fiddle
Larry Franklin - fiddle
Sonny Garrish - steel guitar
Rob Hajacos - fiddle
John Hobbs - keyboards
Sammy Kershaw - lead vocals
Mike Lawler - keyboards
Paul Leim - drums
Gordon Mote - Hammond B-3 organ, piano
Danny Parks - acoustic guitar
Larry Paxton - bass guitar
Brent Rowan - electric guitar
Hal Rugg - steel guitar
John Wesley Ryles - background vocals
Wayne Toups - accordion
John Willis - acoustic guitar
Dennis Wilson - background vocals
Curtis Young - background vocals
Reggie Young - electric guitar

Chart performance

References

External links
[ Honky Tonk Boots] at AllMusic

2006 albums
Sammy Kershaw albums
Albums produced by Buddy Cannon
Albums produced by Norro Wilson
Category 5 Records albums